Blasto is a game released by Gremlin in 1978. The player controls a spaceship and must maneuver it through a mine field. The player tries to beat the clock to destroy all the mines.

Bert Ankrom set the arcade world record on September 8th, 2002 with a verified score of 8,730 points.

A port for the TI-99/4A home computer was later released by Milton Bradley in the first quarter of 1981.

References

1978 video games
Action video games
Arcade video games
Gremlin Industries games
Multiplayer and single-player video games
Puzzle video games
Science fiction video games
TI-99/4A games
Video games about bomb disposal
Video games developed in the United States
Milton Bradley Company video games